Mladost na stopnicah is a novel by Slovenian author Anton Ingolič. It was first published in 1983.

See also
List of Slovenian novels

Slovenian novels
1983 novels